Alexa Rose "Lexy" Kolker (born August 17, 2009) is an American actress. She starred as Chloe in the science fiction thriller film Freaks (2018), which earned her a Young Artist Award and a Saturn Award nomination. Prior to this, she had recurring roles as Mary Swagger on the television series Shooter (2016–2018) and Robin Hinton on the television series Agents of S.H.I.E.L.D. (2017–2018).

Early life 
Kolker was born in California and is the youngest of four sisters. Kayla (* 1998), Jade (* 2001) and Ava Kolker (*2006), who is also an actress and introduced her younger sister to the business. Ava is best known for her roles in American Horror Story and Girl Meets World.
Both sisters played the character of young Robin in Marvel's Agents of S.H.I.E.L.D.; Lexy in six episodes (2017 and 2018) and Ava in one episode (2018).

Career 
Kolker made her acting debut in 2015, in an episode on the crime drama television series Criminal Minds. In 2016, she appeared in the independent action film Female Fight Squad, and in the same year received recognition for playing Mary Swagger, the daughter of Bob Lee Swagger on the action television series Shooter, which was a recurring role that she held throughout the entirety of the show's run. For Shooter, she earned a Young Entertainer Award nomination. In 2017, Kolker was cast in a recurring role on the superhero television series Agents of S.H.I.E.L.D. as Robin Hinton, which she played until 2018.

In 2018, Kolker starred as Chloe in the science fiction–based action film Freaks. The film was released across several film festivals and theatres, and her performance earned positive reviews from critics and audiences alike. Variety magazine wrote that "relative newcomer Kolker carries the film effortlessly." Justin Lowe of The Hollywood Reporter stated that her "semi-improvised performance couldn't be any more authentic", and Collider described her acting as "truly unforgettable work". For the role, she won the Young Artist Award for Best Young Actress in a Feature Film, and received a nomination at the upcoming 2021 Saturn Awards for Best Performance by a Younger Actor.

Also in 2018, Kolker appeared as Lily in the Netflix fantasy film The Little Mermaid; filming was done in Savannah, Georgia in 2016 and was released in 2018 to mixed reviews from critics. In 2019, she appeared in the independent mystery crime film The Case of Jonas Booker as Marley. Kolker is set to star in the upcoming television series For Nothing as Lilliana Pieri, as well as the drama film Manifest West, where she will star as Riley Hayes alongside her sister Ava Kolker.

Filmography

Film

Television

Awards and nominations

References

External links 
 

Living people
American child actresses
Actresses from California
American film actresses
American television actresses
21st-century American actresses
2009 births